Mepco Schlenk Engineering College is an autonomous engineering college located in Virudhunagar near Sivakasi, Tamil Nadu, India.  It was founded on 17 October 1984.  It is an ISO9001:2015 certified institution. It is sponsored by the Mepco Schlenk Charities, a social welfare organization of the Metal Powder Company Limited, Thirumangalam and its German collaborator, Schlenk. The college was affiliated with Madurai Kamaraj University, Madurai until 2002 and later with Anna University, Chennai, but since 2012 it has been affiliated with Anna University of Technology, Chennai.

The medium of instruction is English for all courses, examinations, seminar  presentations and project reports.

Departments
 Civil Engineering
 Electrical and Electronics Engineering
 Electronics and Communication Engineering
 Computer Science Engineering
 Mechanical Engineering
 Information Technology
 Biotechnology
 Artificial Intelligence & Data Science
 Bio Medical Engineering

Infrastructure

A mineral water plant located within the campus has a capacity of 10,000 litres per day. Also on the campus are located the Tamil Nadu Mercantile Bank (TMB) with ATM facility, photo copying centre, canteen, parking lot, stand-by power generators, a separate telephone exchange, television facilities in the hostel, water treatment plant, and students' amenities. The campus has Wi-Fi connectivity. Mobile phones are not allowed in this college.

Most of the student population stays on campus in hostels. The single gender hostels, five for men and five for women, are named after important rivers in India:

Boys' hostels
Godavari
Kaveri
Krishna
Narmadha
Brahmaputra

Girls' hostels
Ganga
Yamuna
Sindhu
Mahanadhi 
tamirabarani

Clubs and associations

Clubs and professional organisations at Mepco serve as an important nodal point in students' lives. Students  perform managerial, organisational and participatory roles in these groups.

International Association of Civil Engineering Students (IACES)
Renewable Energy Club (sponsored by MNRE)
Management Association
Institute of Electrical and Electronics Engineers Student Branch (IEEE)
Institute of Electronics and Telecommunication Engineers (IETE)
Indian Society of Technical Education (ISTE)
Computer Society of India (CSI)
Society of Automotive Engineers (SAE)
Institution of Engineers (IEI)
Club Innovative
Science Forum
Maths Club
Microsoft Campus Club
Literary Association
Fine Arts Club
Photography Club
Reader's Club
Blue sky
 Consumer Club
National Service Scheme (NSS)
Graph Theory and Research Forum
Google students club

Rankings

The National Institutional Ranking Framework (NIRF) ranked it 101 among engineering colleges in 2020.

References

External links
Official college website

Engineering colleges in Tamil Nadu
Education in Virudhunagar district
Educational institutions established in 1984
1984 establishments in Tamil Nadu